The Jamestown Area School District is a diminutive, rural, public school district serving parts of Mercer County, Pennsylvania and Crawford County, Pennsylvania. It encompasses  including the communities of Jamestown and Greene Township in Mercer County, and the municipalities of West Shenango Township and South Shenango Township in Crawford County. The enrollment, in 2011 was 580 pupils. This is among the 10% lowest enrollment in districts within the Commonwealth. According to 2000 federal census data, it serves a resident population of 4,377. By 2010, the district's population declined to 4,245 people. In 2009, the Jamestown Area School District residents' per capita income was $16,562, while the median family income was $40,690.

Jamestown Area School District operates Jamestown Area Elementary School and Jamestown Area Junior Senior High School.

Extracurriculars
Jamestown Area School District offers an extensive program including clubs, activities and a sports program.

Sports
The District funds:

Boys
Baseball – A
Basketball- A
Cross Country – A
Golf – A
Wrestling – AA

Girls
Basketball – A
Cross Country – A
Gymnastics – AAAA
Softball – AA
Volleyball – A

Junior High School Sports

Boys
Basketball
Cross Country
Wrestling	

Girls
Basketball
Cross Country
Volleyball

According to PIAA directory July 2013

References

School districts in Crawford County, Pennsylvania
School districts in Mercer County, Pennsylvania